(), also known as Sigga, Beta & Elín and formerly Tripolia, are an Icelandic band consisting of sisters Sigríður, Elísabet and Elín Eyþórsdóttir. They  in the Eurovision Song Contest 2022 in Turin, Italy with the song "", after winning the Icelandic national selection  2022.

The sisters have previously partnered with DJ Friðfinnur "Oculus" Sigurðsson, with whom they formed the house band  in 2011.

History 
Sigríður, Elísabet and Elín Eyþórsdóttir grew up in Vesturbær and Grafarvogur, Reykjavík. Their mother is singer , and their father is composer and keyboardist  of the band Mezzoforte. The sisters began their musical career in 2011 as part of the band , which they named after their grandmother.  released its debut single "Ain't Got Nobody" in 2013, and partnered with British house label Defected Records for "Do It Good" in 2015 and "Mystified" in 2018. They performed at the Glastonbury Festival in 2016. 

In 2017, they released their first single as a trio, titled "Bounce from the Bottom", under the Tripolia alias.

Outside of music, they are trans rights activists, particularly for transgender children. Elín has a strong relationship with Íris Tanja Flygenring, a well known actress by the TV series, Katla.

2022: Eurovision Song Contest 

On 5 February 2022, Sigga, Beta & Elín were announced as one of the ten acts that had been selected by RÚV to compete in the upcoming edition of Söngvakeppnin, the Icelandic national selection for the Eurovision Song Contest. They performed their entry "" in the first semi-final on 26 February, and advanced to the final on 12 March. They went on to win the competition, beating  in the superfinal, and thereby won the right to represent Iceland in the Eurovision Song Contest 2022 in Turin, Italy. At Eurovision, they qualified for the grand final and placed 23rd.

Discography

Singles

As part of Sísý Ey

Non-single album appearances

References 

Sisters
All-female bands
Folk music groups
Icelandic musical trios
Musical groups from Reykjavík
Eurovision Song Contest entrants of 2022
Eurovision Song Contest entrants for Iceland
Icelandic LGBT rights activists
2011 establishments in Iceland